Ooops! is a British short-form children's television programme, produced by STV Studios, for the ITV network children's strand CITV. For the programme, children tell funny and embarrassing stories about themselves, their friends and life in general.

The show was re-broadcast on STV in 2009 as part of their new children's strand wknd@stv.

External links
Ooops! on STV Player

2000s British children's television series
2000s Scottish television series
2002 British television series debuts
2002 British television series endings
ITV children's television shows
Scottish television shows
Television series by STV Studios